The Sansi language, Sansiboli, or Bhilki, is a highly endangered Indo-Aryan language of the Central group. The language is spoken by the nomadic Sansi people.

Ethnologue sees it as a Hindustani language (Western Hindi). Some sources also mention it as a dialect of the Rajasthani language. Glottolog links it to Punjabi. Kabutra, spoken by a thousand people in Pakistan, is mutually intelligible.

References

Hindustani language
Languages of Rajasthan
Hindi languages
Languages of Pakistan
Endangered Indo-European languages